Garčin railway station (Croatian: Željeznička stanica Garčin) ) is a railway station on Novska–Tovarnik railway. Located in settlement Garčin. Railroad continued to Slavonski Brod in one and the other direction to Andrijevci. Garčin railway station consists of 5 railway track.

See also 
 Croatian Railways
 Zagreb–Belgrade railway

References 

Railway stations in Croatia